Tim Ariesen (born 20 March 1994) is a Dutch former racing cyclist, who rode professionally between 2014 and 2019 for five different teams.

Major results

2015
 1st  Overall Carpathian Couriers Race
1st  Sprints classification
 1st Grand Prix des Marbriers
 4th Schaal Sels
 6th Overall Tour de Gironde
1st  Young rider classification
 6th Antwerpse Havenpijl
2016
 2nd Road race, National Under-23 Road Championships
 9th Grand Prix des Marbriers
2017
 10th Dorpenomloop Rucphen
2018
 6th Ronde van Overijssel
 8th Classic Loire-Atlantique

References

External links

1994 births
Living people
Dutch male cyclists
People from Rhenen
Cyclists from Utrecht (province)